Lond is a town in Khyber Pakhtunkhwa province of Pakistan. It is located at 34°51'0N 72°10'0E with an altitude of 2625 metres (8615 feet).

References

Populated places in Khyber Pakhtunkhwa